In enzymology, a gentisate 1,2-dioxygenase is an enzyme that catalyzes the chemical reaction

2,5-dihydroxybenzoate + O2  maleylpyruvate

Thus, the two substrates of this enzyme are 2,5-dihydroxybenzoate and O2, whereas its product is 3-maleylpyruvate.

This enzyme belongs to the family of oxidoreductases, specifically those acting on single donors with O2 as oxidant and incorporation of two atoms of oxygen into the substrate (oxygenases). The oxygen incorporated need not be derived from O2.  The systematic name of this enzyme class is gentisate:oxygen 1,2-oxidoreductase (decyclizing). Other names in common use include gentisate oxygenase, 2,5-dihydroxybenzoate dioxygenase, gentisate dioxygenase, and gentisic acid oxidase.  This enzyme participates in tyrosine metabolism.  It employs one cofactor, iron.

Structural studies

As of late 2007, only one structure has been solved for this class of enzymes, with the PDB accession code .

References

 Boyer, P.D., Lardy, H. and Myrback, K. (Eds.), The Enzymes, 2nd ed., vol. 8, Academic Press, New York, 1963, p. 353-371.
 
 

EC 1.13.11
Iron enzymes
Enzymes of known structure